Bertil Samuelson (born 21 December 1974) is a Danish rower. He competed in the men's double sculls event at the 2000 Summer Olympics.

References

External links
 

1974 births
Living people
Danish male rowers
Olympic rowers of Denmark
Rowers at the 2000 Summer Olympics
Rowers from Copenhagen